Sacred Songs is American singer/songwriter Daryl Hall's first solo album. It was produced by guitarist Robert Fripp, who also played on the album.

The album was recorded in 1977 but Hall's label, RCA Records, did not release it for three years. According to Nick Tosches, who wrote Dangerous Dances, the authorized biography of Hall & Oates, "RCA refused to release Sacred Songs on the grounds that it wasn't commercial" (p 85). When finally released,  the album sold well, but ultimately did not yield a hit single.

Recording

Background
In the early 1970s, Hall had formed Hall & Oates, a partnership with guitarist/songwriter John Oates. They had produced several hit pop singles, but Hall had grown to feel artistically limited and in 1977 was much more concerned with expressing his own outlook on life and music than with making more hit songs.

Fripp had dissolved his group King Crimson in 1974, and after a sabbatical, returned to music with session work and other guest appearances.

According to the notes for the 1999 CD reissue of Sacred Songs, and to Eric Tamm's book-length study of Fripp's music, Hall and Fripp first met in 1974. Already familiar with one another's work, the duo felt an instant rapport, and planned to work together.

In 1977, Hall and Fripp reconnected while Hall was writing songs for his solo debut; Hall drafted Fripp as producer and guitarist. Hall wrote all the songs, except "Urban Landscape", (a 'Frippertronics' solo), and "NYCNY" for which Fripp wrote the music and Hall the lyrics, and which appeared also on Fripp's Exposure (1979) only with different lyrics as "I May Not Have Had Enough of Me but I've Had Enough of You".

Sacred Songs was recorded in a span of three weeks, with most of the songs initially recorded with Hall singing and playing piano alongside Fripp's guitar work, followed by overdubs by Hall & Oates' regular touring band. Hall insisted on working with his own band rather than with the Los Angeles session musicians who had played on Bigger Than Both of Us (1976), the previous fifth Hall & Oates album.  Although the session players were uniformly excellent musicians, Hall felt their performances were hampered by a disconnectedness from the songs. The album was originally intended to be part of a loose trilogy of sorts with Peter Gabriel's 1978 second album and Fripp's Exposure (1979), all of which Fripp produced.

Besides Hall and Fripp, the backing band for the album consisted of bassist Kenny Passarelli, drummer Roger Pope, and guitarist Caleb Quaye, all of whom were then part of the second iteration of the Elton John Band, which had started recording and touring with John beginning in 1975.

RCA shelves the album
Though still relatively pop-oriented, Sacred Songs was very different from Hall & Oates, and RCA feared the album might be unsuccessful and alienate Hall's mainstream fans.  So the company shelved the record, and release was postponed indefinitely.

Outraged, Hall and Fripp passed tapes of Sacred Songs to music journalists and disc jockeys. Tosches notes that a groundswell of interest was generated inside the music profession and from Hall's fans with a letter-writing campaign directed at RCA requesting the album's release.

Release and afterwards
Upon release, Sacred Songs peaked at #58 on the Billboard Pop Albums chart; however, there was no hit single from the record.

Afterwards, Hall recorded vocals for most of the tracks on Fripp's solo debut, Exposure (1979), however due to pressure from RCA and Hall's management this was cut back to just two songs on the final release ("You Burn Me up I'm a Cigarette" and "North Star"). These are included on some CD versions of Sacred Songs. Nearly thirty years after Hall recorded these songs, most were finally released on the 2006 re-issue of Exposure (1979) by Fripp's Discipline Global Mobile label. In notes for the 1999 Buddha Records CD reissue, Fripp describes Hall as the best all-around singer he'd ever met and speculates that had Sacred Songs been released as planned in 1977 at the height of the punk rock zeitgeist, music fans and critics might have seen Hall not only as a good R&B and pop singer, but rather as a creative innovator comparable to iconic British singer David Bowie.

Fripp and Hall considered forming a full-time band together with bassist Tony Levin and drummer Jerry Marotta, but only Levin stayed while Adrian Belew and Bill Bruford replaced Hall and Marotta, respectively. The group was originally planned to use the name Discipline, but gradually morphed into the Mark IV version of King Crimson.

Hall performed the song "NYCNY" with indie rock band Minus the Bear on Episode 62 his TV show, Live From Daryl's House.  In the commentary after the song was played, Hall mentions that it was the first time he had played the song since the one time it was performed in the studio in 1978 for the recording of the album. The song "Why Was It So Easy" was performed with Butch Walker on episode 54 of Live From Daryl's House, "Babs and Babs" was performed with Guster on episode 38 and Ben Folds on episode 70, and "North Star" was performed with Monte Montgomery on episode 9.  "Don't Leave Me Alone With Her" was also performed with Ben Folds on episode 70.

Influences
Both the lyrics and musical sounds of Sacred Songs reflected Hall's personal philosophy. The lyrical content alludes to some of Hall's interests in Aleister Crowley's system of esoteric magic (or "magick" as it is sometimes spelled). Rock music author Timothy White interviewed Hall for the book Rock Lives. In that interview Hall indicated that in 1974 he began a serious study of esoteric spirituality, reading books on topics like the cabala, the ancient Celts, and the traditions of the Druids. He also became interested in the life and beliefs of Aleister Crowley. Crowley coined the concept of Thelema, magick concerned with harnessing the power of the imagination and willpower to effect changes in consciousness and in the material universe. For example, the album track "Without Tears" is based on Crowley's book Magick without Tears (published in 1973).

Fripp shared similar interests in mysticism; while at Sherbourne House in the mid-seventies, he studied the recorded lectures of the late John G. Bennett, a disciple of G. I. Gurdjieff.

Track listing
All songs written by Daryl Hall; except as noted.
 "Sacred Songs" – 3:14
 "Something in 4/4 Time" – 4:22
 "Babs and Babs" – 7:41
 "Urban Landscape" (Robert Fripp) – 2:29
 "NYCNY" (Fripp, Hall) – 4:33
 "The Farther Away I Am" – 2:52
 "Why Was It So Easy" – 5:27
 "Don't Leave Me Alone with Her" – 6:22
 "Survive" – 6:37
 "Without Tears" – 2:47

Bonus tracks
 "You Burn Me Up, I'm a Cigarette" (Fripp, Hall) – 2:20
"North Star" (Fripp, Hall, Joanna Walton) – 3:10

Personnel
 Daryl Hall – vocals, keyboards, synthesizer
 Robert Fripp – guitar, Frippertronics
 Caleb Quaye – guitar
 Kenny Passarelli – bass guitar
 Roger Pope – drums
Additional personnel
 Charles DeChant – saxophone: baritone on "Sacred Songs", backing vocals on "Something in 4/4 Time"
 David Kent – backing vocals on "Something in 4/4 Time"
 Tony Levin – bass on "You Burn Me up I'm a Cigarette" and "North Star" 
 Jerry Marotta – drums on "You Burn Me up I'm a Cigarette"
 Brian Eno – synthesizer on "North Star"
 Sid McGinnis – pedal steel guitar on "North Star"
 Phil Collins – drums on "North Star"

Production
 Producer – Robert Fripp
 Reissue Producer – Mike Ragogna
 Engineer – Ed Sprigg
 Assistant Engineer – Ted Spencer
 Mastered by George Piros at Atlantic Studios (New York, NY).
 Cover – Sara Allen
 Photography – William Coupon
 Project Coordinators – Arlessa Barnes, Lisa Butler, Glenn Delgado, Christina DeSimone, Robin Diamond, Felicia Gearhart, Laura Gregory, Jeremy Holiday, Robin Manning, Ed Osborne, Larry Parra, Bruce Pollock, Dana Renert, Catherine Seligman and Steve Strauss.

Charts

Album

References

Bibliography
 Nick Tosches, Daryl Hall/John Oates: Dangerous Dances (New York: St. Martin's Press, 1984). 
 Timothy White, "Daryl Hall," in Rock Lives (New York: Henry Holt & Co, 1990), pp. 581–594. 

Daryl Hall albums
1980 debut albums
Albums produced by Robert Fripp
RCA Records albums